The 1978 English Leather Grand Prix, also known as the Stowe Tennis Grand Prix, was a men's tennis tournament played on outdoor hard courts at the Topnotch Inn in Stowe, Vermont in the United States that was part of the 1978 Grand Prix circuit. It was the inaugural edition of the tournament and was held from August 14 through August 20, 1978. First-seeded Jimmy Connors won the singles title.

Finals

Singles
 Jimmy Connors defeated  Tim Gullikson 5–7, 6–3, 6–2
 It was Connors' 8th singles title of the year and the 69th of his career.

Doubles
 Tom Gullikson /  Tim Gullikson defeated  Mark Edmondson/  Kim Warwick 3–6, 7–6, 6–3

References

Stowe Grand Prix
Stowe Grand Prix